Boreham Wood Football Club is a professional football club based in Borehamwood, Hertfordshire, England. They are currently members of the National League, the fifth tier of English football, and play at Meadow Park. Established in 1948, they are known as "the Wood" and have a local rivalry with St Albans City.

History
The club was established in 1948 as a merger of Boreham Wood Rovers and Royal Retournez, and began playing in the Mid-Herts League. In 1951 they joined the Parthenon League, and finished as runners-up in 1953–54 and 1954–55 before winning the title in 1955–56. After finishing as runners-up again in 1956–57, they joined the Spartan League. They finished as runners-up in 1963–64 and again in 1965–66, after which they switched to Division Two of the Athenian League.

The 1968–69 season saw Boreham Wood win Division Two, earning promotion to Division One. The following season they finished as runners-up in Division One and were promoted to the Premier Division. After the division was disbanded in 1973, the club were placed in Division One for the 1973–74 season, in which they were league champions and reached the first round of the FA Cup for the first time, eventually losing 3–0 at Southend United. At the end of the season the club joined Division Two of the Isthmian League. They won the division in 1976–77 and were promoted to the renamed Premier Division. The following season saw them reach the first round of the FA Cup again, losing 2–0 in a replay to Swindon Town after a 0–0 draw at home.

The club remained in the Premier Division until being relegated to Division One at the end of the 1981–82 season, in which they finished bottom of the table. In 1994–95 they were Division One champions, and were promoted back to the Premier Division. The 1996–97 season saw them reach the second round of the FA Cup for the first time after they beat Rushden & Diamonds 3–2 in a first round replay. In the second round they lost 2–1 at Luton Town. In the same season they also won the Isthmian League Cup. They repeated their FA Cup feat the following season, beating Hayes in the first round before losing 2–0 to Cheltenham Town in a replay. In 1998–99 they reached the first round again, losing 3–2 at home to Luton.

After being relegated in 1999–2000 they won Division One at the first attempt to make an immediate return to the Premier Division. However, they were relegated again at the end of the 2002–03 season, although the season did see them reach the FA Cup first round again, where they lost 5–0 at Torquay United. After one season in Division One North (and another FA Cup first round appearance, a 4–0 defeat at Blackpool), they were transferred to Division One East of the Southern League.

After winning Division One East in 2005–06, a season in which they also reached the semi-finals of the FA Trophy, losing 3–0 on aggregate to Woking, the club were promoted to the Premier Division of the Isthmian League. A fourth-place finish in 2009–10 saw them qualify for the promotion play-offs, and after beating Aveley 1–0 in the semi-finals, a 2–0 win over Kingstonian in the final resulted in promotion to the Conference South. The 2012–13 and 2013–14 seasons saw the club reach the FA Cup first round again, losing at home to Brentford and away at Carlisle United in a replay. In 2014–15 Boreham Wood finished as runners-up in the Conference South. In the subsequent play-offs, they beat Havant & Waterlooville 4–2 on aggregate before defeating Whitehawk 2–1 in the final to earn promotion to the renamed National League. Their first season in the National League saw a tenth FA Cup first round appearance, ending with a 2–1 defeat at home to Northwich Victoria.

In the 2017–18 FA Cup Boreham Wood beat Football League opposition for the first time, defeating Blackpool 2–1 at home in the first round. In the second round they lost 3–0 at Coventry City. The club went on to finish fourth in the National League at the end of the season, qualifying for the play-offs. After beating AFC Fylde 2–1 and Sutton United 3–2, they lost 2–1 to Tranmere Rovers in the Wembley final. In 2019–20 the club finished fifth and again qualified for the play-offs. After defeating Halifax Town 2–1 in the quarter-finals, they lost 1–0 to Harrogate Town in the semi-finals. The club reached the first round of the 2020–21 FA Cup, in which they defeated League Two club Southend United 4–3 on penalties after a 3–3 draw. They went on to beat Canvey Island 3–0 in the second round, earning a third round tie with Millwall, which they lost 2–0. In the 2021–22 FA Cup, the club reached the fifth round for the first time after beating League One club AFC Wimbledon in the third round and Championship club AFC Bournemouth in the fourth. They lost 2–0 to Premier League club Everton in the fifth round.

Ground
The club initially played at Eldon Avenue until moving to Meadow Park in 1963.

Current squad

Management staff

Honours
Isthmian League
Division One champions: 1976–77, 1994–95, 2000–01
League Cup winners: 1996–97
Southern League
Division One East champions: 2005–06
Athenian League
Division One champions: 1973–74
Division Two champions: 1968–69
Parthenon League
Champions: 1955–56
Herts Senior Cup
Winners: 1971–72, 1998–99, 2001–02, 2007–08, 2013–14, 2017–18, 2018–19
Herts Charity Cup
Winners: 1980–81, 1983–84, 1985–86, 1988–89, 1989–90
London Challenge Cup
Winners: 1997–98

Records
Best league performance: 4th in the National League, 2017–18
Best FA Cup performance: Fifth round, 2021–22
Best FA Amateur Cup performance: Third round, 1970–71
Best FA Trophy performance: Semi-finals, 2005–06
Record attendance: 4,101 vs St Albans City, FA Cup second round, 6 December 2021
Most appearances: David Hatchett, 714
Most goals: Mickey Jackson
Record transfer fee paid: £18,000 to Dagenham & Redbridge for Morgan Ferrier
Record transfer fee received: £25,000+ from Walsall for Morgan Ferrier

See also
Boreham Wood F.C. players
Boreham Wood F.C. managers

References

External links

Official website

 
Borehamwood
Football clubs in England
Football clubs in Hertfordshire
Association football clubs established in 1948
1948 establishments in England
Mid-Herts Football League
Parthenon League
Spartan League
Athenian League
Isthmian League
Southern Football League clubs
National League (English football) clubs